Burai Dam is an earthfill dam on Burai River near Sakri, Dhule district in state of Maharashtra in India.

Specifications

Purpose
 Irrigation

See also
 Dams in Maharashtra
 List of reservoirs and dams in India

References

Dams in Dhule district
Dams completed in 1983
1983 establishments in Maharashtra